Ruslan Yuriyovych Stepanyuk (born 16 January 1992) is a Ukrainian professional footballer who plays as a striker for Vorskla Poltava.

Career

Early years
Stepanyuk is the product of the revived Kolos Nikopol (since 2001) and the School of Physical Culture (UFK) Dnipropetrovsk's Youth Systems, and his first trainer was Vitaliy Minyaylo.

Tavriya Simferopol
Stepanyuk's professional career continued when he was promoted to the youth team of Tavriya Simferopol.

Stal Alchevsk
In 2012 he made his debut for Stal Alchevsk in the Ukrainian First League.

Olimpik Donetsk
He played for Olimpik Donetsk in the Ukrainian Premier League.

Honours

Individual
 Ukrainian First League best player: 2016–17
 Ukrainian First League top scorer: 2016–17

References

External links 

1992 births
Living people
Ukrainian footballers
FC Elektrometalurh-NZF Nikopol players
FC Stal Alchevsk players
FC Hoverla Uzhhorod players
FC Oleksandriya players
FC Olimpik Donetsk players
NK Veres Rivne players
FC Zhetysu players
FC Vorskla Poltava players
Ukrainian Premier League players
Ukrainian First League players
Ukrainian Second League players
Ukrainian expatriate footballers
Expatriate footballers in Kazakhstan
Ukrainian expatriate sportspeople in Kazakhstan
Association football forwards
Sportspeople from Dnipropetrovsk Oblast